Phish, or phishing, may refer to:

Music, arts, & entertainment 

 Phish, an American rock band
 Phish (album), a demo album released by the American rock band Phish

Other uses 

 Phishing, a form of Internet deception